Oberea lutea is a species of beetle in the family Cerambycidae. It was described by Thunberg in 1787.

References

lutea
Beetles described in 1787